General Sir Norman Hastings Tailyour,  (12 December 1914 – 28 December 1979) was a Royal Marines officer who served as Commandant General Royal Marines from 1965 to 1968.

Military career
Tailyour was commissioned into the Royal Marines in 1933. He served in the Second World War as commander of the Royal Marines on the Landing Craft Base HMS Robertson from 1943, as executive officer on the Land Craft Base HMS St Mathew from later that year and then as commander of 27th Battalion Royal Marines in North West Europe from 1945. He was Mentioned in Despatches in 1945 and awarded the Distinguished Service Order (DSO) for his command of the battalion.

Tailyour was appointed commanding officer of 45 Commando in 1954. As lieutenant colonel, he was the commanding officer of 45 Commando, flown off  by helicopter to land at the Port Said during the Suez Crisis in 1956, when he was also wounded by a Fleet Air Arm Wyvern – friendly fire. This was the first helicopter-borne, opposed assault from the sea in history. He was again Mentioned in Despatches for his services in the Suez in 1956, and awarded a Bar to his DSO for his command of 45 Commando in Cyprus later that year.

Tailyour became commander of the Royal Marine Barracks at Plymouth in 1957, chief of staff to the Amphibious Warfare Representative in Washington D. C. in 1958 and commander of 3 Commando Brigade in 1960. He went on to be Commander Plymouth Group of the Royal Marines in 1962. He was appointed a Companion of the Order of the Bath in 1963, and promoted to Knight Commander in the 1966 Birthday Honours. He became Commandant General Royal Marines in 1965 before retiring in 1968.

Retirement
In retirement Tailyour was Captain of Deal Castle from 1972 to 1980. He was an Honorary Admiral in the Texan Navy and an Honorary Lance Corporal in the French Zuaves. He was the Commodore of the Royal Marines Sailing Club and the first Honorary Flag Officer. He was also a member of the Royal Yacht Squadron, the Royal Naval Sailing Association (Rear Commodore) and the Royal Cruising Club.

Personal life
Tailyour's son, Ewen Southby-Tailyour, was also a Royal Marines officer, who served with distinction in Dhofar and the Falklands War: Norman Tailyour was also a yachtsman. His brother-in-law was a Royal Marines major, one nephew was a Royal Marines brigadier, a step-son was a Royal Marines captain and another nephew was a captain in the Royal Marines Reserve. His wife June (née Southby), whom he married in 1941 and who predeceased him in 1971, had trained as a doctor at Göttingen University (Germany) before the Second World War. Prior to her marriage June Southby was a nurse at St George's Hospital, London, then, being bilingual in German, she joined the WRNS as a 'decoder' of German signals at Chatham Naval Base, a sub-station of Station X, aka Bletchley Park.

References

1914 births
1979 deaths
Captains of Deal Castle
Royal Marines personnel of World War II
Companions of the Distinguished Service Order
Knights Commander of the Order of the Bath
British military personnel of the Suez Crisis
Royal Marines generals
British military personnel of the Cyprus Emergency